Holbrookia maculata, commonly known as the lesser earless lizard,  is a species of lizard in the family Phrynosomatidae. The species is native to the southwestern and central United States and northern Mexico. There are eight recognized subspecies.

Taxonomy

Subspecies
The following eight subspecies of Holbrookia maculata are recognized as being valid, including the nominotypical subspecies.
H. m. bunkeri H.M. Smith, 1935 – Bunker's earless lizard
H. m. campi 
H. m. dickersonae Schmidt, 1921 – Dickerson's earless lizard
H. m. flavilenta Cope, 1883
H. m. maculata Girard, 1851 – northern earless lizard
[[Holbrookia maculata perspicua|H. m. perspicua]] Axtell, 1956 – eastern earless lizard, prairie eastern lizard H. m. pulchra K.P. Schmidt, 1921 – Huachuca earless lizardH. m. ruthveni H.M. Smith, 1943 – bleached earless lizard (an ecotonal subspecies from New Mexico's White Sands)

Subspecies etymology
The subspecific name, bunkeri, is in honor of American zoologist Charles Dean Bunker (1870–1948).

The subspecific name, campi, is in honor of American paleontologist Charles Lewis Camp.

The subspecific name, dickersonae, is in honor of American herpetologist Mary Cynthia Dickerson.

The subspecific name, ruthveni, is in honor of American herpetologist Alexander Grant Ruthven.

DescriptionH. maculata is a small species of lizard. The dorsal scales are granular and smooth. There are no external ear openings. There are two folds across the throat. The throat of the female is orange during the breeding season. The underside of the tail has no dark spots. 

Distribution and habitatH. maculata is found in the U.S. states of Arizona, Colorado, Kansas, Oklahoma, Nebraska, New Mexico, South Dakota, Texas, Utah, and Wyoming, as well as in the Mexican states of Chihuahua, Coahuila, Durango, Guanajuato, Jalisco, Nuevo León, San Luis Potosí, Sinaloa, Sonora, and Zacatecas. www.reptile-database.org.

The preferred natural habitats of H. maculata are shrubland, grassland, and desert.

Behaviour and ecologyH. maculata is oviparous. It preys upon insects and spiders.

References

External links
Animals of White Sands National Park

Further reading
Boulenger GA (1885). Catalogue of the Lizards in the British Museum (Natural History). Second Edition. Volume II. Iguanidæ ... London: Trustees of the British Museum (Natural History). (Taylor and Francis, printers). xiii + 497 pp. + Plates I-XXIV. (Holbrookia maculata, p. 209).
Conant R (1975). A Field Guide to Reptiles and Amphibians of Eastern and Central North America, Second Edition. Boston: Houghton Mifflin. xviii + 429 pp. + Plates 1-48.  (paperback),  (hardcover). (Holbrookia maculata, pp. 96–97 + Plate 14 + Map 58).
Girard CF (1851). "On a New American Saurian Reptile". Proceedings of the American Association for the Advancement of Science 4: 200–202. (Holbrookia maculata, new species).
Smith HM, Brodie ED Jr (1982). Reptiles of North America: A Guide to Field Identification. New York: Golden Press. 240 pp.  (paperback),  (hardcover). (Holbrookia maculata, pp. 128–129).
Stebbins RC (2003). A Field Guide to Western Reptiles and Amphibians, Third Edition. The Peterson Field Guide Series ®. Boston and New York: Houghton Mifflin. xiii + 533 pp. . (Holbrookia maculata'', p. 278 + Plate 28 on p. 90 + Map 80 on p. 484).

Holbrookia
Fauna of the Western United States
Reptiles of the United States
Reptiles of Mexico
Reptiles described in 1851